The 2023 Dayton Flyers baseball team represents the University of Dayton during the 2023 NCAA Division I baseball season. The Flyers play their home games at Woerner Field as a member of the Atlantic 10 Conference. The Flyers are led by head coach Jayson King, in his 6th season at Dayton.

Background 

The 2022 season saw Dayton post a 23–27 (10–14 Atlantic 10) record. The Flyers failed to earn a berth in both the Atlantic 10 and NCAA baseball tournaments.

Preseason

Preseason Atlantic 10 awards and honors
Infielder Cam Redding was named to the All-Atlantic 10 Preseason team.

Coaches poll 
The Atlantic 10 baseball coaches' poll was released on February 7, 2023. Dayton was picked to finish fifth the Atlantic 10.

Personnel

Starters

Game log

Statistics

Team batting

Team pitching

Rankings

References

External links 
 Dayton Baseball

Dayton Flyers
Dayton Flyers baseball seasons
Dayton Flyers baseball